Ximena Ayala (born 29 December 1980) is a Mexican actress. She has appeared in more than thirty films since 1999.

Selected filmography

References

External links 

Living people
Mexican film actresses
1980 births